Princess Majeedah Nuurul Bulqiah (born 16 March 1976) is the fourth child of Sultan Hassanal Bolkiah and Consort Queen Saleha. She presently serves as the Department of the Environment, Parks and Recreation's Senior Environment Officer and Chief of the Planning and Management Division. This organization is part of the Ministry of Development.

Biography

Early life and education 
On 16 March 1976, Princess Majeedah Nuurul Bulqiah was born. She holds a Bachelor of Arts (Hons) in Administration and Public Policy from the University of Brunei Darussalam (UBD) and an Master of Arts in Environmental Development from King's College London in January 2005.

Career 
On 11 February 2002, Majeebah started her work as a Special Duties Officer in the Environment Unit, a division of the Ministry of Development in charge of strategic and policy-related environmental issues. Evaluating the Environmental Impact Assessment Report of the Sungai Liang Industrial Site Development is one of the duties of the Planning and Management Division. The Asean Youth Forum on Environment, which took place on 8 January 2007, is one of a number of successful initiatives under her direct supervision.

Her writings include the Position Paper on Brunei's Accession to the Basel Agreement to Control the Disposal and Transboundary Transport of Hazardous Waste and the Environmental Management Guidelines for Quarry Activities.

Personal life 
Her name Majeedah (or Majida) means "Magnificent" or "Glorious".

On 10 June 2007, Princess Majeedah married Khairul Khalil at the Omar Ali Saifuddien Mosque. He was given the noble title YAM Pengiran Anak. From their marriage, the couple had two children.

Legacy

Namesakes 

 Pengiran Anak Puteri Majeedah Nuurul Bulqiah Religious School, a religious school in Kampong Kilanas.

Honours 

She has been awarded :
  Order of the Crown of Brunei (DKMB)
  Silver Jubilee Medal (5 October 1992)
  Golden Jubilee Medal (5 October 2017)

Ancestry

References

External links
Brunei Princess Weds in Lavish Ceremony

1976 births
Living people
Bruneian Muslims
Bruneian royalty
Bruneian women
Alumni of King's College London
Bruneian expatriates in the United Kingdom
Daughters of monarchs